The World Society of Victimology (WSV) is an international, non-governmental organization, holding special category consultive status with the Economic and Social Council of the United Nations as well as with the Council of Europe. Its international membership includes: front-line victim service providers, academics and researchers in related social sciences, government representatives, doctors, lawyers, law enforcement and emergency service personnel, students and members of the interested public.

The purpose of the WSV is to advance the research of victimology and improvement of practices on an international level; to improve collegiality and cooperation in the field, and to promote cooperation between global, regional, national, and local organizations and agencies which serve or work with victim issues.

External links 
 World Society of Victimology

Victimology
International organisations based in Australia
Victims' rights